Walter Esser (born 21 February 1945) is a German modern pentathlete. He competed for West Germany at the 1972 and 1976 Summer Olympics.

References

1945 births
Living people
German male modern pentathletes
Olympic modern pentathletes of West Germany
Modern pentathletes at the 1972 Summer Olympics
Modern pentathletes at the 1976 Summer Olympics
People from Saxony-Anhalt